Braulio Florencio Peña Salegui (14 November 1892 - Unknown), or simply known as Florencio Peña, was a Spanish footballer who played as a forward for Arenas de Getxo. The highlight of his career was scoring one of the winning goals of the 1919 Copa del Rey Final to help Arenas defeat the powerful FC Barcelona 5–2. Peña also started in both games of the 1917 Copa del Rey Final against Madrid FC.

Honours
Arenas Club 
North Championship: 1916–17, 1918–19

Copa del Rey: 1919
Runner-up: 1917

References

1892 births
Spanish footballers
Association football forwards
Year of death missing
Arenas Club de Getxo footballers
Footballers from Getxo